Methyl phenkapton is an organophosphorus compound. It is highly toxic.

References 

Acetylcholinesterase inhibitors
Organophosphate insecticides
Methoxy compounds
Thiophosphoryl compounds
Chloroarenes